The 1898 Pennsylvania gubernatorial election was held on November 8, 1898. It featured a three-way campaign between major party candidates William Stone and George Jenks, as well as a strong showing by prohibitionist Silas Swallow.

Candidates

Prohibition 
Silas C. Swallow, minister and Prohibition activist (from Dauphin County)

Democratic 
George A. Jenks, former United States Solicitor General (from Jefferson County)
Alexander Hamilton Coffroth, former U.S. Congressman

Republican 
William A. Stone, U.S. Congressman (from Allegheny County)
Charles Warren Stone, U.S. Congressman

Campaign
Entering the election, the Republican machine was strong but its leadership was divided. Although previous governor Daniel Hastings had tried to toe the line between the conservative and progressive wings of the party, he failed to impress either side. Party bosses Matthew Quay, a conservative, and John Wanamaker, a progressive, nominated candidates with the same last name but who were of no relation. In a close race, the conservatives prevailed, but the party had difficulty reuniting after William Stone defeated retired U.S. Army Colonel Charles W. Stone.

Jenks' campaign had difficulty gaining traction from the start, and Stone was able to undercut some of Swallow's support by identifying with the temperance movement. Stone also did well by emphasizing his commitment to law and order, after labor strife had rocked the state during the previous governor's term.

Results

References

 

Pennsylvania
1898
Gubernatorial
November 1898 events